New York's 13th congressional district is a congressional district for the United States House of Representatives in New York City, represented by Adriano Espaillat. The district is the smallest congressional district by area in the U.S.

The 13th district comprises Upper Manhattan and parts of the West Bronx. It includes The Bronx neighborhoods of Bedford Park, Jerome Park, Kingsbridge Heights, Norwood, and parts of Fordham, Kingsbridge, Morris Heights, and University Heights, and the Manhattan neighborhoods of Harlem, Inwood, Marble Hill, Spanish Harlem, Washington Heights, and parts of Morningside Heights and the Upper West Side. The Apollo Theater and Grant's Tomb are within the district. From 2003 to 2013, the district included all of Staten Island and the neighborhoods of Bay Ridge, Bensonhurst, Dyker Heights, and Gravesend in Brooklyn. Most of the territory in the old 13th district is now in New York's 11th congressional district.

Voting

History 

Various New York districts have been numbered "13" over the years, including areas in New York City and various parts of upstate New York.

1803–1809:
Montgomery
1847–1849:
Albany
1913–1945:
Parts of Manhattan
1945–1993:
Parts of Brooklyn
1993–2013:
All of Staten Island
Parts of Brooklyn
2013–present:
Parts of Manhattan, The Bronx

List of members representing the district

Recent election results 
In New York State electoral politics there are numerous minor parties at various points on the political spectrum. Certain parties will invariably endorse either the Republican or Democratic candidate for every office, hence the state electoral results contain both the party votes, and the final candidate votes (Listed as "Recap").

See also

List of United States congressional districts
New York's congressional districts
United States congressional delegations from New York

Notes

References 

 Congressional Biographical Directory of the United States 1774–present
 1996 House election data Clerk of the House of Representatives
 1998 House election data Clerk of the House of Representatives
 2000 House election data Clerk of the House of Representatives
 2002 House election data Clerk of the House of Representatives
 2004 House election data Clerk of the House of Representatives
 2006 New York Election Results The New York Times
 2008 New York Rep.in Congress Returns, New York State Board of Elections
 Election Results 2010 The New York Times

13
Staten Island
Politics of Brooklyn
Manhattan
Constituencies established in 1803
1803 establishments in New York (state)